Teddy is an English language given name, usually a hypocorism of Edward or Theodore. It may refer to:

People

Nickname
 Teddy Atlas (born 1956), boxing trainer and fight commentator
 Teddy Bourne (born 1948), British Olympic epee fencer
 Teddy Bridgewater (born 1992), Minnesota Vikings quarterback
 Teddy Dunn (born 1981), American actor
 Teddy Edwards (1924–2003), American jazz saxophonist
 Tivadar Farkasházy (born 1945), Hungarian humorist, author, mathematician, economist and journalist
 Teddy Gipson (born 1980), American basketball player
 Teddy Higuera (born 1957), former Major League Baseball pitcher
 Teddy Hoad (1896–1986), West Indian cricketer
 Ted Kennedy (1932–2009), long-serving American Senator from Massachusetts
 Teddy Kollek (1911–2007), six-time mayor of Jerusalem
 Theodore Long (born 1947), general manager for World Wrestling Entertainment
 Teddy Morgan (1880–1949), Welsh international rugby union player
 Teddy Park (born 1978), record producer for YG Entertainment
 Teddy Pendergrass (1950–2010), American singer and songwriter
 Teddy Pilley (1900–1982), linguist and conference interpreter
 Teddy Riley (born 1967), American singer, songwriter, musician and record producer
 Theodore Roosevelt (1858–1919), 26th President of the United States
 Teddy Scholten (1926–2010), Dutch singer
 Teddy Sheean (1923–1942), Royal Australian Navy Second World War sailor awarded the Victoria Cross for Australia
 Teddy Sheringham (born 1966), English retired footballer
 Teddy Taylor (1937—2017), British conservative politician
 Teddy Wilson (1912–1986), American jazz pianist
 Teddy Yarosz (1910–1974), world middleweight boxing champion (1934–1935)
 Teddy Yip (businessman) (1907–2003), Formula One racing team owner

Given name
 Teddy Apriyana Romadonsyah (born 1990), Indonesian basketball player
 Teddy Riner (born 1989), French judoka
 Teddy Tahu Rhodes (born 1966), New Zealand operatic baritone
 Teddy Tamgho (born 1989), French triple jumper
 Teddy Wang (1933–?), Chinese businessman kidnapped in 1990 and declared legally dead
 Teddy, Australian murder victim. He and his family were murdered by his son Sef Gonzalez

Stage name
 Teddy Geiger (born 1988), American singer and songwriter
 Teddy Hart (born 1980), ring name of Canadian professional wrestler Edward Annis
 Teddy Park (born 1978), South Korean rapper and record producer

Animals
 Teddy (horse), a racehorse and sire
 Teddy, Mack Sennett's dog in his silent movies

Fictional characters
 Teddy Burns, from the television series Man with a Plan
 Father Ted Crilly, from the television series Father Ted
 Teddy (Mr. Bean character), bear character from the television series Mr. Bean
 Teddy, in Saraba Kamen Rider Den-O: Final Countdown
 Teddy, coroner's assistant in Halloween III: Season of the Witch, played by Wendy Wessberg
 Teddy Altman, a doctor on the TV series Grey's Anatomy, played by Kim Raver
 Teddy Duncan, from the television series Good Luck Charlie
 Edward "Teddy" Lupin, from the Harry Potter series
 Teddy Ruxpin, an animatronic talking bear
 Ted "Teddy" Talbot, Jr., in the TV series Rectify
 Teddy, in the TV series Bob's Burgers
 Teddy (Square root) Ortiz, a main character in the comic strip Big Nate
 Teddy Klaue, from the film Krampus
 Grizzly Teddy, from Demonic Toys
 Teddy “KGB”, the main antagonist in the film Rounders
 Teddy, playable character in Mother

See also
 Tedy Bruschi (born 1973), American football player
 Teddy bear, named after Theodore Roosevelt 
 Teodoro Locsin Sr. (1914–2000), Filipino journalist nicknamed "Teddy Boy"
 Teodoro Locsin Jr. (born 1948), Filipino politician, diplomat, lawyer and former journalist nicknamed "Teddy Boy", son of the above
 Ted (disambiguation)

Hypocorisms
Lists of people by nickname
English masculine given names
English-language masculine given names